Uroš Sremčević (born 24 April 2006) is a Serbian footballer currently playing as a forward for Mladost Lučani.

International career
Sremčević has represented Serbia at youth international level.

Career statistics

Club

Notes

References

2006 births
Living people
Serbian footballers
Serbia youth international footballers
Association football forwards
Serbian SuperLiga players
FK Mladost Lučani players